The United Nations High Seas Treaty is an instrument of the United Nations Convention on the Law of the Sea (UNCLOS), agreed by an intergovernmental conference at the UN on 4 March 2023.  Its full formal title is Agreement under the United Nations Convention on the Law of the Sea on the conservation and sustainable use of marine biological diversity of areas beyond national jurisdiction.

While about one third of the Earth's ocean is covered by exclusive economic zones, which are the particular domain of the nearest country for economic purposes, the remainder of the oceans and seabeds are mostly unregulated, without any legal framework to protect them or organize international cooperation. These areas are called the high seas or international waters. 

The treaty will provide a legal framework for establishing marine protected areas (MPAs) in international waters to protect against the loss of wildlife. It also contains a procedure for managing returns from the genetic resources of the high seas. It includes the establishment of a conference of the parties (COP) that will meet periodically, and enable signatory states to be held to account on the treaty's implementation. Before the treaty can come into force, it needs to be formally adopted at a later UN session and then ratified by at least sixty parties to the treaty.

Rules and regulations adopted through the treaty may be enforced by bodies like the International Maritime Organization. The High Seas Treaty would also require environmental impact assessments for activities like deep sea mining in the open ocean.

See also
2022 United Nations Biodiversity Conference

References

External links
UN delegates reach historic agreement on protecting marine biodiversity in international waters (UN News, 5 March 2023)

2023 in international relations
United Nations treaties
Proposed treaties
Marine conservation
Law of the sea treaties